Margaretta Hare Morris (3 December 1797 – 29 May 1867) was an American entomologist.  Morris and the astronomer Maria Mitchell were the first women elected to the American Association for the Advancement of Science in 1850. She was also the second woman elected to the Academy of Natural Sciences of Philadelphia in 1859, after Lucy Say.

Life
Morris was born on 3 December 1797, in Philadelphia, one of six children of Luke Morris (1760-1802), a lawyer, and Ann Willing Morris (1767-1853). Trained by tutors, including Thomas Nuttall, Thomas Say, and Charles Alexandre Lesueur, the Morris sisters, especially Margaretta and her botanist sister Elizabeth Carrington Morris, became a part of the larger nineteenth-century scientific community. Margaretta and Elizabeth lived in the same house in Germantown where they performed most of their scientific experiments. They regularly attended lectures at the Germantown Academy. The sisters were part of a network that included Asa Gray, William Darlington, Thaddeus William Harris, Louis Agassiz, Dorethea Dix, Mary Roberdeau, and Isabella Batchelder James, with whom they shared specimens and findings.

Research 
Morris studied the habits of wheat flies that resembled the Hessian fly, concluding that the eggs were laid in the grain rather than the stalk as had been previously thought. She also studied the seventeen year locust and fungi as botanical pests. She first described Magicicada cassinii, a species of periodical cicada, which were later named after John Cassin. Her results were important to agriculture and orchards. She sent her papers to scientific societies such as the American Philosophical Society, which at the time only had men as members so the papers had to be read on her behalf. She also published regularly in the American Agriculturist and other agricultural journals, occasionally under pseudonyms.

Works

Family papers
Some of the Morris family papers passed, apparently through Margaretta's younger sister, Susan Sophia Morris (1800-1868), the wife of John Stockton Littell (1806-1875), into the Littell family. They are incorporated in the Littell family papers, currently held in the special collections of the library of the University of Delaware.

Illustrations
Morris provided botanical illustrations for a paper by William Gambel in the Journal of the Academy of Natural Sciences (1848)

Published papers
 
  1841-3
  1846-1847. 
  1848-1849

See also
Timeline of women in science

References

External links
 Moon, Robert C. (1898) The Morris Family of Philadelphia: Descendants of Anthony Morris, Born 1654-1712 Died. Philadelphia: Robert C. Moon, M.D. 
 Vol. 1  
 Vol. 2 
 Vol. 3
 Vol. 4
 Vol. 5

Archives 

 Littell family papers at Special Collections, University of Delaware Library

1797 births
1867 deaths
18th-century American women
19th-century American women scientists
Women entomologists
American entomologists
Scientists from Philadelphia